Ajumako is a town in Ghana. It is the capital of Ajumako-Enyan-Esiam district. It is famous for being the birthplace of Ottobah Cugoano, an abolitionist of the 18th century.

The University of Education, Winneba (Ajumako Campus) is situated there.

Populated places in the Central Region (Ghana)